Chittapur Assembly constituency is one of the 225 constituencies in the Karnataka Legislative Assembly of Karnataka a south state of India. Chittapur is also part of Gulbarga Lok Sabha constituency.

Members of Legislative Assembly

See also
 Chittapur
 Kalaburagi district
 List of constituencies of Karnataka Legislative Assembly

References

Assembly constituencies of Karnataka
Kalaburagi district